The Old Lady is a 1932 Italian comedy film directed by Amleto Palermi. It features Vittorio De Sica in his first sound film.

Cast
 Emma Gramatica as Maria
 Nella Maria Bonora as Bianchina
 Maurizio D'Ancora as Fausto
 Armando Falconi as Zaganello
 Memo Benassi as Lenticcio
 Maria Della Lunga Mandarelli
 Vittorio De Sica
 Anna Maria Dossena as Bianca La Nipotina
 Camillo Pilotto
 Lydia Simoneschi

References

External links

1932 films
1932 comedy films
Italian comedy films
1930s Italian-language films
Italian black-and-white films
Films directed by Amleto Palermi
1930s Italian films